Valea Stânei may refer to several villages in Romania:

 Valea Stânei, a village in Săruleşti Commune, Buzău County
 Valea Stânei, a village in Cârlibaba Commune, Suceava County

See also 
 Valea Stânei River (disambiguation)
 Stâna (disambiguation)